Martin Brown may refer to:

 Martin Brown, writer of Paris 
 Martin Brown (footballer) (1900–1988), Australian rules footballer for South Melbourne
 Martin Brown (cancer biologist), British scientist
 Martin Brown, producer of films including Moulin Rouge!
 Martin Brown (died 1968), victim of English 11-year-old killer Mary Bell
 Martin Brown (mixed martial artist) (born 1984), American boxer and mixed martial artist

See also

Marty Brown (disambiguation)
Martin Browne (disambiguation)
Martin (disambiguation)
Brown (disambiguation)